Healthcare Leadership Council is an organization of Chief Executive Officers from several companies and organizations associated with the health care field in the United States.  Membership includes heads of health insurance companies, pharmaceutical companies, medical device manufacturers, pharmacy chains, hospitals, and others.  The organization's website describes it as "a coalition of chief executives from all disciplines within American healthcare" and a "forum ... to jointly develop policies, plans, and programs to achieve their vision of a 21st century system that makes affordable, high-quality care accessible to all Americans."

Healthcare Leadership Council is a listed member of a Washington PR firm called Partnership for America’s Health Care Future.

During the 2009 debate over health care reform in the United States, Medicare Today, a project of Healthcare Leadership Council, produced state-specific television advertising encouraging citizens to contact their congresspersons to ensure that Medicare funding is unaffected by the debate.

References

External links
 Official website
 Crunch time for K Street on healthcare, The Hill, October 12, 2009

Healthcare reform advocacy groups in the United States
Medical and health organizations based in Washington, D.C.